John Grogan (born 1956 in Cashel, County Tipperary, Ireland) is an Irish retired hurler who played as a full-forward for the Tipperary senior team.

A dual player in the minor and under-21 grades, Grogan made his first appearance for the Tipperary senior team in the 1976 championship. He was a semi-regular member of the team over much of the next decade. During that time he failed to land any honours as his inter-county career coincided with a sharp downturn in Tipperary's fortunes.

At club level Grogan is a Munster and county club championship medalist with Cashel King Cormac's. He also played with Ballyhea in Cork.

References 

1956 births
Living people
Cashel King Cormac's hurlers
Ballyhea hurlers
Tipperary inter-county hurlers